The White River is a major headwaters tributary of the Kootenay River in southeastern British Columbia, Canada.

It rises at Sylvan Pass, in a precipitous glacial basin in Height of the Rockies Provincial Park. It flows southwards through a deep valley along the Park Ranges, then swings southwest to receive the North Fork from the right. The river then makes a broad northwestward curve around the south flank of Flett Peak, passing Whiteswan Lake Provincial Park. It then flows generally north-northwest, emptying into the Kootenay on the left bank.

The river's drainage basin of some  consists almost entirely of virgin forest. There are no bridges, diversions or dams.

See also
List of rivers of British Columbia

References

Rivers of British Columbia
Tributaries of the Kootenay River
Kootenay Land District